Kamberi is an Albanian surname that may refer to the following notable people:
Florian Kamberi (born 1995), Swiss-born Albanian football player
Hasan Zyko Kamberi, 18th-19th century Albanian writer 
Shaip Kamberi (born 1964), Serbian politician with Albanian ethnicity

See also
 Kambari languages

Albanian-language surnames